The ČSD E 669.2 is a class of electric locomotives designed, built and used in the former Czechoslovakia for heavy freight trains. The class is a development of the E 669.1 class.

Surviving members of the class are now used in the Czech Republic (ČD Class 182) by ČD Cargo and ODOS, in Slovakia by private operator Lokorail and in Poland by various private operators including CTL Logistics and PTK Holding).

History
As the class is a slight modification of Class E669.1, no prototype was built. The locomotives were built in the years 1963–65 in three types: 59E1, 59E2 and 59E3. 168 locomotives were built in those series.

Currently the whole class is being systematically withdrawn in the Czech Republic, where the last survivors are based in Ostrava. In Slovakia the whole series was withdrawn on 31 March 2006. Since 2005, withdrawn locomotives have usually been rented or sold to various Polish private operators.

Nicknames
Šestikolak (English The Sixwheeler) in the Czech Republic - from the number of wheels
Rakaňa in Slovakia

See also
List of ČD Classes

References

External links
 Website for E 669 locos (Czech)
 Website for E 669.0 (Czech)

Co′Co′ locomotives
Electric locomotives of Czechoslovakia
Electric locomotives of the Czech Republic
Electric locomotives of Slovakia
Railway locomotives introduced in 1963
Škoda locomotives
Standard gauge locomotives of Czechoslovakia
Standard gauge locomotives of the Czech Republic
Standard gauge locomotives of Poland
Standard gauge locomotives of Slovakia
Co′Co′ electric locomotives of Europe